Noxudlu may refer to:
Aşağı Noxudlu, Azerbaijan
Yuxarı Noxudlu, Azerbaijan